Keilberg (Schneeberg) is a mountain in West-Erzgebirge of Saxony, southeastern Germany, nearby the town Schneeberg.

On its top stands a 21 meter high tower and a gastronomic house. Both buildings were erected in the end of 19th century.

Literature 

 Reinhart Heppner und Jörg Brückner: Sächsisch-böhmische Aussichtsberge des westlichen Erzgebirges in Wort und Bild mit touristischen Angaben. Horb am Neckar 2001, S. 42–43.

External links 

Mountains of Saxony
Mountains of the Ore Mountains